AEA or Aea may refer to:

Organisations
 Academy of Entertainment Arts, a program at Dixie Hollins High School in St. Petersburg, Florida
 Actors' Equity Association, a U.S. labor union
 AeA, formerly known as the American Electronics Association, a non-profit technology trade association
 Aerial Experiment Association, an early aeronautical research organisation
 Aero Engineers Australia
 Alabama Education Association
 American Economic Association
 American Evaluation Association
 Arkansas Environmental Academy
 Associação de Escuteiros de Angola
 Association of European Airlines

Companies
 AEA Investors, one of the oldest private equity firms in the United States
 AEA Technology, a British company mainly specialising in environmental consulting
 Air Europa (ICAO code)

Mythology
 Aeaea

 Aea, the main city of Colchis
Aea, a mythological huntress

Science and technology
 Air Entraining Agent; see Foam Index
 Arachidonoylethanolamide, an alternative name for Anandamide

Places 
Aea (Malis), Greece
Kutaisi, Georgia

Other uses
 Abemama Atoll Airport (IATA code), an airport on Abemama, Kiribati
 Advanced Extension Award, of the British educational system
 Alberta Emergency Alert a public warning system
 Annual Emission Allocation, a bilateral emission trading scheme for European countries' emissions not included in the European Union Emission Trading Scheme
 Areba language (ISO 639-3 code)
 Autoerotic asphyxiation, a sexual act

See also
 United Kingdom Atomic Energy Authority (UKAEA), a UK governmental nuclear research organisation